The Last Place You'll Look is an EP by the Scottish indie rock band We Were Promised Jetpacks, released on 9 March 2010 in the US and Canada, and on 12 April 2010 in the UK and Europe by Fat Cat Records.

In comparison with the band's first album, These Four Walls, The Last Place You'll Look has more subdued instrumentation, with additional string accompaniments appearing on the majority of the tracks.

Background and recording
The EP was recorded within a two-week deadline by the band's sound engineer, Andrew Bush. The band are said to have entered the studio with only "rough sketches" and "older versions" of songs as their starting point.

Track listing
All songs written by We Were Promised Jetpacks.

"A Far Cry" – 4:52
"Short Bursts" (alternative version) – 3:37
"The Walls Are Wearing Thin" – 1:53
"With the Benefit of Hindsight" – 4:13
"This Is My House, This Is My Home" (alternative version) – 5:00

Personnel
We Were Promised Jetpacks
Adam Thompson – vocals, guitar
Michael Palmer – lead guitar
Sean Smith – bass guitar
Darren Lackie – drums

Additional musicians
Andrew Bush – additional instrumentation
Suz Appelbe – additional instrumentation
Helena Flint – additional instrumentation
Mike Truscott – additional instrumentation

Technical personnel
Andrew Bush – recording, mixing, producer
We Were Promised Jetpacks – producer
Alan Douches – mastering

Artwork
dlt – artwork

References

2010 EPs
We Were Promised Jetpacks albums
FatCat Records EPs